K. Ulaganathan is an Indian politician and former Member of the Tamil Nadu Legislative Assembly from the Tiruthuraipundi constituency from 2006 to 2016. He represents the Communist Party of India party.

References 

Communist Party of India politicians from Tamil Nadu
Members of the Tamil Nadu Legislative Assembly
Living people
Year of birth missing (living people)